Zhang Xian is a Chinese god who is the enemy of the tiangou, a legendary creature in the form of a dog who creates eclipses. It is said that he protects his children from the dog with his bow and arrows. He is often depicted aiming at the sky, waiting for the beast to appear.

He is the god of birth and the protector of male children. Many sought him to give them male offspring and to protect their living children.

References

See also
Apotropaic magic, which wards away misfortune

Archers
Childhood gods
Chinese gods